An allonge (from French allonger, "to draw out") is a slip of paper affixed to a negotiable instrument, as a bill of exchange, for the purpose of receiving additional endorsements for which there may not be sufficient space on the bill itself. An endorsement written on the allonge is deemed to be written on the bill itself. An allonge is more usually met with in countries using the Napoleonic Code, as the code requires every endorsement to express the consideration. Under English law, the simple signature of the endorser on the bill, without additional words, is sufficient to operate as a negotiation and so an allonge is seldom necessary.

Other uses

Allonge
In chemistry, an allonge is a dated French term for a separatory column.
In hairdressing, an allonge is a wig with locks of hair reaching to the shoulders.

Allongé
In coffee preparation, a café allongé is a 'long' (drawn out) espresso shot, known as a caffè lungo in Italian.
In dressage, an allongé is a long rein used for working a horse, or an extended trot.
In fencing, an allongé is a thrust or pass at the enemy.

See also

Apostille
Collegatary
Rider (politics)

References

Legal terminology